There is no county-wide local education authority in Berkshire, instead education services are provided by the six smaller unitary authorities of Bracknell Forest, Reading, Slough, West Berkshire, Windsor and Maidenhead and Wokingham:

 List of schools in Bracknell Forest
 List of schools in Reading, Berkshire
 List of schools in Slough
 List of schools in West Berkshire
 List of schools in Windsor and Maidenhead
 List of schools in Wokingham